Micheal Clemons (born August 21, 1997) is an American football defensive end for the New York Jets of the National Football League (NFL). He played college football at Cisco College before transferring to Texas A&M.

Early life and high school
Clemons grew up in Garland, Texas and attended Sachse High School.

College career
Clemons began his collegiate career at Cisco College. In his lone season with the Wranglers, he recorded 30 tackles, 8.5 tackles for loss, and 2.5 sacks in six games played. After the season, Clemons committed to transfer to Texas A&M.

Clemons played in 13 games in his first season at Texas A&M and had 19 tackles, three tackles for loss, and one sack. He suffered a foot injury during preseason training camp going into his junior season and used a medical redshirt. Clemons played in 11 games with nine starts as a redshirt junior an recorded 28 tackles. He had 14 tackles, 4.5 tackles for a loss, and four sacks before suffering a season ending-injury in the fifth game of his redshirt senior season. Clemons decided to utilize the extra year of eligibility granted to college athletes who played in the 2020 season due to the coronavirus pandemic and return to Texas A&M for a fifth season. He finished his final season with 32 tackles, 11 tackles for loss, and seven sacks.

Professional career
Clemons was selected in the fourth round, 117th overall, of the 2022 NFL Draft by the New York Jets.

References

External links
 New York Jets bio
Texas A&M Aggies bio

Living people
Players of American football from Texas
Sportspeople from the Dallas–Fort Worth metroplex
American football defensive ends
Texas A&M Aggies football players
Cisco Wranglers football players
New York Jets players
People from Garland, Texas
1997 births